Roman Čerepkai (born 6 April 2002) is a Slovak footballer who plays for FC ViOn Zlaté Moravce as a forward, on loan from FK Teplice.

References

External links
 ŠK Slovan Bratislava official club profile 
 
 Fortuna Liga profile 
 Futbalnet profile 

2002 births
Living people
Footballers from Bratislava
Slovak footballers
Slovakia youth international footballers
Association football forwards
ŠK Slovan Bratislava players
2. Liga (Slovakia) players
Czech First League players
FK Teplice players
FC ViOn Zlaté Moravce players
Slovak expatriate sportspeople in the Czech Republic
Expatriate footballers in the Czech Republic